Mercury or The Mercury is the name or part of the name of the following newspapers:

Australia
 Illawarra Mercury, a daily newspaper
 Maitland Mercury
 St Arnaud Mercury, Victoria
 The Mercury (Hobart)

Canada
 Guelph Mercury, Guelph, Ontario
 Quebec Mercury, a defunct 19th century weekly newspaper published in Quebec City, Quebec

South Africa
 The Mercury (South Africa), an English language newspaper published in Durban, South Africa

United Kingdom
 Clevedon Mercury, a free weekly newspaper
 Leicester Mercury, a regional newspaper
 London Mercury, a list of periodicals published in London
 Matlock Mercury
 Reading Mercury, a defunct newspaper which was published in Berkshire, England
 Stamford Mercury, a weekly paid-for newspaper, the oldest continuous newspaper title in England
 The Mercury, for many years  the Saturday edition of The Scarborough News 
 Sherborne Mercury, a defunct newspaper
 Staffordshire Mercury, which was published in Staffordshire, England
 The Somerset Mercury, a regional newspaper in Somerset, England
 Sunday Mercury, a newspaper in Birmingham, England
 The Weston & Somerset Mercury, a weekly paid for newspaper in Somerset, England

United States
 Las Vegas Mercury, a defunct newspaper in Las Vegas, Nevada
 The Mercury (Pennsylvania), a daily newspaper published in Pottstown
 The Manhattan Mercury, a local afternoon newspaper in Kansas
 Mercury (Newport), Rhode Island
 Pittsburgh Mercury, a 19th-century newspaper in Pittsburgh, Pennsylvania
 Portland Mercury, an alternative weekly newspaper published in Oregon
 San Jose Mercury, now The Mercury News, a daily newspaper published in San Jose, California

See also
 El Mercurio, the largest newspaper by circulation in Chile
 El Mercurio de Valparaíso, another Chilean newspaper, the oldest continuously published newspaper in Spanish
 El Mercurio (Ecuador)
 Mercury (disambiguation)